Dlouhá Ves is a municipality and village in Klatovy District in the Plzeň Region of the Czech Republic. It has about 800 inhabitants.

Administrative parts
Villages of Annín, Bohdašice, Janovice, Nové Městečko, Platoř and Rajsko are administrative parts of Dlouhá Ves.

References

Villages in Klatovy District
Bohemian Forest